Anna Katharina Valayil is an Indian musician who performs in Malayalam and Tamil. Her single "Appangal Embadum" appeared in the movie Ustad Hotel.

Life 
Valayil was born in India and later moved to Nigeria. She has a Bachelor's Degree from St. Theresa's College, Cochin, a Master's in Media Studies from Swinburne University, and has attended flying school. She spent three years in South Australia studying indigenous music. Her debut music video was Honey Bee.

She has collaborated with Gopi Sundar, Santhosh Chandran and Marthyan. In 2012 she won the award for Best Singer Female at the Kochi Times Film Awards. The following year she won Best Debut Artist at the GMMA Awards, the Favorite New Voice award at Mollywood Nakshatra, and was nominated for Best Debutante Singer at the SIIMA Awards.

Filmography

Singer

Songwriter

References

 |Manorama Article
 Raaga
 |Manorama Article
 Manorama, Audio Launch of "Laila O Laila"
Bangalore Days

Malayalam playback singers
Indian women playback singers
Tamil playback singers
Singers from Kerala
Malayali people
Living people
Musicians from Kottayam
1984 births
Film musicians from Kerala
21st-century Indian singers
21st-century Indian women singers
Women musicians from Kerala
St. Teresa's College alumni